Bismillah Khan may refer to

 Bismillah Khan (1914–2006), Indian musician
 Bismillah Khan (politician) (born 1948), Pakistani politician
 Bismillah Khan (cricketer) (born 1990), Pakistani cricketer

See also 

 Bismillah Khan Mohammadi (born 1961), Afghan politician